MS Ukraina was one of six Soviet s during the late 1920s built for the Black Sea State Shipping Company. During the Second World War, she participated in the Siege of Odessa in 1941 and the Siege of Sevastopol in 1942. She was sunk by German aircraft in July.

Description 
The four ships built in Leningrad were shorter than the pair built in Germany, but had more powerful engines. She had a pair of six-cylinder, two-stroke diesel engines, each driving a screw propeller, and the engines were rated at a total of 1,374 nominal horsepower. The ship had a designed capacity of 450 passengers.

Construction and career 
Ukraina was one of the four ships in the class that were constructed in 1928 at the Baltic Works shipyard in Leningrad. After completion the ship was assigned to the Black Sea State Shipping Company by Sovtorgflot with its port of registry at Odessa.

After the invasion of the Soviet Union on 22 June 1941 (Operation Barbarossa) by Nazi Germany and its allies, Ukraina was used for military tasks. The ship arrived in Odessa on 14 October to begin loading the city's defenders and reached Sevastopol on the 16th without damage despite repeated German air attacks.

Ukraina was sunk by German bombers of the First Group of Bomber Wing 76 in Novorossiysk harbour on 2 July 1942.

References

Bibliography

 

Krim-class ocean liner
Ships built at the Baltic Shipyard
Ships sunk by German aircraft
World War II passenger ships of the Soviet Union
Maritime incidents in July 1942
World War II shipwrecks in the Black Sea